De Clerck is a Dutch surname, particularly common in Flanders. In the province of West Flanders, the name is usually concatenated to Declerck.  People with the surname include:

 (1914–1974), Belgian politician and government minister
Carl Alexander Clerck (1709–1765), Swedish entomologist and arachnologist
Hendrik de Clerck (c. 1560 – 1630), Flemish painter
Jacques de Clerck (c. 1582 – 1624), Antwerp-born Dutch merchant, admiral, and explorer
Jeanne Albertine Colin-De Clerck (born 1924), Belgian composer
Marc De Clerck (born 1949), Belgian football goalkeeper
Olivier De Clerck (born 1971), phycologist with the standard author abbreviation "De Clerck"
Richard Declerck (1899–1986), Belgian lawyer and politician
Roger De Clerck (1924–2015), Belgian entrepreneur
Stefaan Maria Joris Yolanda De Clerck (born 1951), Belgian politician

See also 
 De Clercq
 Leclercq (surname)
 Leclerc (surname)
 Clerc (surname)

References

Dutch-language surnames
Surnames of Belgian origin
Occupational surnames